Petite Maman is a 2021 French fantasy drama film, written and directed by Céline Sciamma. Starring Joséphine Sanz, Gabrielle Sanz, Stéphane Varupenne, Nina Meurisse and Margo Abascal, the film follows a young girl coping with the death of her maternal grandmother by bonding with her mother.

The film had its world premiere at the 71st Berlin International Film Festival on 3 March 2021, and was released in France on 2 June 2021, by Pyramide Distribution. The film received widespread critical acclaim.

Plot
Eight year old Nelly has just lost her maternal grandmother. Her parents retreat to her mother's childhood home in order to empty it out. Nelly's mother is deeply upset by the whole process and leaves during the night without saying goodbye to Nelly.

Going out into the woods to play, Nelly meets a girl her own age building a fort. The girl, Marion, is extremely friendly and invites Nelly to help her. When it begins to rain, Marion takes Nelly to her home. After Nelly explains that she is visiting the area after the death of her grandmother, Marion tells her that her own grandmother, also named Nelly, died recently. Going through the house, Nelly realizes that it is her grandmother's house and Marion is her mother. Alarmed, she flees and is relieved when she returns to the house and finds her father in the present.

Nelly returns a second time to the woods and sees her mother again. They continue to build the fort. Nelly learns that they are the same age and that in three days, Marion is set to have an operation to prevent her from developing the same illness as her mother. Returning repeatedly, Nelly is able to spend time with her grandmother and learn things about her mother such as she harbours ambitions of being an actress.

The day before departure, Nelly reveals to Marion that she is her daughter and comes from the future. To prove it, she brings Marion to her grandmother's house where she reveals to Marion that her mother dies when Marion is 31 and that Nelly loved her deeply. The two are interrupted by Nelly's father, who tells Nelly that he has finished early and wants to return in time for her mother's birthday. Marion asks Nelly to sleep over and Nelly convinces her father to let her stay an extra night so she can spend more time with Marion.

Nelly and Marion celebrate Marion's ninth birthday during the sleepover. The following morning, Marion prepares to go to the hospital. Nelly reassures her the operation will be fine. Nelly also reveals that her mother is a sad person and she often wonders if it is because of her. Marion reassures her that she does not think this is the case. The two hug before Marion leaves for the hospital and Nelly returns home for a final time.

Returning to her grandmother's house, Nelly is surprised by her mother who has returned for a final viewing of the house. The two embrace, as they say each other's names.

Cast
 Joséphine Sanz as Nelly
 Gabrielle Sanz as Marion
 Stéphane Varupenne as Father
 Nina Meurisse as Mother
 Margo Abascal as Grandmother

Production
In November 2020, it was announced Céline Sciamma would write and direct, with Bénédicte Couvreur serving as a producer, with Pyramide Distribution set to distribute.

Principal photography began in November 2020.

Release
Petite Maman had its world premiere at the 71st Berlin International Film Festival in March 2021, where Neon bought North American distribution rights to the film the same day. A week later, MUBI acquired the distribution rights for the UK, Ireland and Turkey. It was released in France on 2 June 2021, by Pyramide Distribution.

The film screened at the Toronto International Film Festival in September 2021. It also screened at the 2021 San Sebastián International Film Festival, where it won the Audience Award.

In February 2023, The Criterion Collection announced the film would be joining the collection in May that year.

Critical reception
Petite Maman received critical acclaim.  On Metacritic, the film holds a rating of 93 out of 100, based on 37 critics, indicating "universal acclaim". English film critic Mark Kermode called it his favourite film of 2021, writing "Whether you are six or 60, this astonishingly insightful and heartbreakingly hopeful cinematic poem will pierce your heart, broaden your mind and gladden your soul, even as you wipe away tears."

Awards and nominations

References

External links
 
 
 

2021 films
2020s French-language films
French fantasy drama films
2020s fantasy drama films
Films about children
Films about families
Films directed by Céline Sciamma
Films set in forests
Films about grieving
2020s female buddy films
French female buddy films
2020s French films